The Bangladesh National Geographical Association is an association of geographers in Bangladesh.

History
The Bangladesh National Geographical Association was established in 1973 by geographers in Dhaka. It publishes an academic journal called Journal of Bangladesh Geographical Association. The association runs a specialized geography library. It is funded through membership dues and journal sale. It currently has more than 600 members.

References

1973 establishments in Bangladesh
Organisations based in Dhaka
Learned societies of Bangladesh
Research institutes in Bangladesh